Gino Mulder (born 9 October 1987) is an Aruban international footballer who plays for Dutch club HBS Craeyenhout, as a midfielder.

Career
He has played club football for Haaglandia, Katwijk, De Jodan Boys, Quick Den Haag and HBS Craeyenhout.

He made his international debut for Aruba in 2015.

References

1987 births
Living people
Aruban footballers
Aruba international footballers
Haaglandia players
VV Katwijk players
CVV de Jodan Boys players
HBS Craeyenhout players
Association football midfielders
Aruban expatriate footballers
Aruban expatriates in the Netherlands
Expatriate footballers in the Netherlands
H.V. & C.V. Quick players